The WWE Women's Tag Team Championship  is a professional wrestling women's tag team championship created and promoted by the American promotion WWE. It is the only women's tag team championship for WWE's main roster, thus is defended across both the Raw and SmackDown brand divisions. The current champions are Becky Lynch and Lita, who are in their first reign, both as a team and individually.

The championship was established on the December 24, 2018, episode of Monday Night Raw. Bayley and Sasha Banks, then going by the team name of The Boss 'n' Hug Connection, were the first champions who were part of the Raw brand during their inaugural reign. The championship was originally established to be available to Raw, SmackDown, and WWE's developmental territory NXT, but after a controversial finish to a title defense in March 2021, the NXT Women's Tag Team Championship was created, thus the WWE Women's Tag Team Championship became no longer available to NXT. The WWE Women's Tag Team Championship has been contested in the headlining match of one WWE pay-per-view event: TLC: Tables, Ladders & Chairs in 2019.

The title is distinct from the WWF Women's Tag Team Championship that was contested from 1983 to 1989 and does not share its lineage.

History

In 1989, the then-World Wrestling Federation (WWF) abandoned the WWF Women's Tag Team Championship due to the lack of women's tag teams in the division. This remained true up through the 2000s—in 2002, the WWF was renamed to World Wrestling Entertainment (WWE). In the early 2010s, the women's division began growing, and in 2012, WWE.com ran an article supporting the resurrection of the Women's Tag Team Championship. In 2014, The Bella Twins (Brie Bella and Nikki Bella) discussed a desire to establish a Divas Tag Team Championship—from 1999 to 2016, female performers were referred to as Divas and their top championship from 2010 to 2016 was the WWE Divas Championship. The idea for a women's tag team championship was seemingly forgotten about until mid-2018; in an interview with Sky Sports, WWE's Chief Brand Officer Stephanie McMahon stated that in regards to the titles debuting, "Not quite yet, but that's absolutely something we've heard loud and clear from our fan base and it's something we're keen on implementing as soon as we are able to." Prior to WWE's first all-female pay-per-view Evolution in October, speculations—including comments from current female wrestlers—arose that the promotion would debut the titles at the event. Just prior to the event, Stephanie said that the titles would be coming "sooner than we think"; the titles, however, were not debuted at Evolution. Speculation died down after the event, however, on the December 3, 2018, episode of Monday Night Raw, when questioned by a fan about what they wanted to bring to the women's division in 2019, Bayley and Sasha Banks stated that they wanted to become the inaugural WWE Women's Tag Team Champions.

During the December 24, 2018, special Christmas episode of Raw, WWE Chairman and Chief Executive Officer Vince McMahon officially announced that a new WWE Women's Tag Team Championship would be introduced in 2019. On the January 14, 2019, episode of Raw, the championship belts were unveiled by Alexa Bliss on her segment, "A Moment of Bliss". After the unveiling, Bliss announced that the inaugural champions would be decided at Elimination Chamber on February 17, 2019, in a tag team Elimination Chamber match, featuring three teams from Raw and three teams from SmackDown, making the title available to both brands. On the February 18 episode of Raw, it was revealed that the titles could also be defended on the NXT brand.

To determine the three teams from Raw, qualification matches were held and began on the January 28 episode of Raw. The teams of Nia Jax & Tamina and The Riott Squad (Liv Morgan and Sarah Logan) qualified by defeating the teams of Alexa Bliss & Mickie James and Natalya & Dana Brooke, respectively. The following week, The Boss 'n' Hug Connection (Bayley and Sasha Banks) defeated Alicia Fox & Nikki Cross to win Raw's final spot. No qualification matches were held to determine the three teams from SmackDown due to its smaller roster, and instead, each team declared their participation. The team of Mandy Rose & Sonya Deville announced theirs on the January 29 episode of SmackDown Live, The IIconics (Billie Kay and Peyton Royce) confirmed their entry via Twitter, and Carmella & Naomi accepted the final spot on the February 5 episode. The Boss 'n' Hug Connection would go on and win the match, lastly eliminating Rose & Deville by way of Banks submitting Deville, to become the inaugural champions.

The title headlined a pay-per-view event for the first time at TLC: Tables, Ladders & Chairs in 2019. The Kabuki Warriors (Asuka and Kairi Sane) defended the championship against Becky Lynch & Charlotte Flair in the first women's tag team Tables, Ladders, and Chairs match, where The Kabuki Warriors retained.

On the March 3, 2021, episode of NXT, WWE Women's Tag Team Champions Nia Jax and Shayna Baszler defended the championship against NXT's Dakota Kai and Raquel González, who had earned the title opportunity for winning the inaugural Women's Dusty Rhodes Tag Team Classic. The match ended in controversy, however, as the referee was taken out and WWE official Adam Pearce, who officiates on Raw and SmackDown, sent a second referee to the ring, who ruled that Kai submitted to Baszler, although Kai was not the legal woman. The following week, in response to the controversy, NXT General Manager William Regal established the NXT Women's Tag Team Championship for the brand as to not deal with Raw and SmackDown's politics any longer, and awarded the championship to Kai and González. The WWE Women's Tag Team Championship effectively became no longer available to NXT.

During the May 16, 2022, episode of Raw, reigning champions Sasha Banks and Naomi reportedly walked out after a meeting with Vince McMahon due to a creative dispute. WWE released an official statement, in which the company stated that Banks and Naomi "walked into WWE Head of Talent Relations John Laurinaitis' office with their suitcases in hand, placed their tag team championship belts on his desk and walked out". The two were originally booked for the show's main event, which had to be reworked. On the following episode of SmackDown, it was announced that Banks and Naomi had been suspended indefinitely, therefore the titles were vacated. A tournament was also announced to be held to determine new champions. On the August 5 episode of SmackDown, WWE official Adam Pearce announced that the tournament would begin on the August 8 episode of Raw. Although the championship is no longer defended on NXT, one team from the brand competed in the tournament as part of the SmackDown bracket. The team of Aliyah and Raquel Rodriguez (formerly Raquel González) won the tournament to win the vacant championship.

WWE Women's Tag Team Championship Tournament (2022) 
After Sasha Banks and Naomi had been suspended indefinitely and the titles had been vacated, SmackDown commentator Michael Cole announced that there would be a tournament to declare new champions. The tournament began on the August 8 episode of Raw and was held across episodes of Raw and SmackDown until its conclusion on the August 29 episode of Raw.

Belt design
The championship belts were unveiled by wrestler Alexa Bliss on the January 14, 2019, episode of Raw. The belts feature three plates on a white leather strap, which is smaller than the men's titles. The three plates are outlined in gold while the inner portion is mostly silver. The WWE logo is affixed at the top of the circular center plate, which has four protruding edges. At the center, the word "Tag Team" is prominently written in gold. Above that is a gold banner that reads "Women's" while below is a gold banner that reads "Champions". Similar to how the men's Raw and SmackDown Tag Team Championships are Greek inspired, the center plate is encircled by a meander pattern. There is also margent ornamentation in the inner circle. In what has become a prominent feature with WWE's championship belts, the two side plates feature a removable center section that can be customized with the champion's logos; the default side plates feature the WWE logo on a globe. Generally, the reigning team will have one side plate on each belt dedicated to each champion, unless the team has a name (e.g., The Kabuki Warriors).

Reigns

The inaugural championship team was Bayley and Sasha Banks, who at the time went by the team name of The Boss 'n' Hug Connection. As a team, they are tied with the teams of Alexa Bliss and Nikki Cross, Nia Jax and Shayna Baszler, and Damage CTRL (Dakota Kai and Iyo Sky) for the most reigns at two, while individually, Cross/A.S.H. (prior to her third reign, her ring name changed to Nikki A.S.H.), Banks, Bliss, and Asuka share the record with three reigns. As a team, The Kabuki Warriors (Asuka and Kairi Sane) have the longest reign at 171 or 172 days (180 days as recognized by WWE due to tape delay), while the team of Bliss and Asuka have the shortest reign at 5 days (4 days as recognized by WWE). As a team, Jax and Baszler have the longest combined reign at 215 days, while individually, Asuka has the longest combined reign at 218 days (225 days as recognized by WWE due to tape delay). Lita is the oldest champion, winning the title at 47 years old, while Rhea Ripley is the youngest, winning it at 24.

Becky Lynch and Lita are the current champions in their first reign, both as a team and individually. They defeated Damage CTRL (Dakota Kai and Iyo Sky) on the February 27, 2023, episode of Raw in Grand Rapids, Michigan.

See also
 Tag team championships in WWE
 Women's championships in WWE

Notes

References

External links
 Official Women's Tag Team Title History

Women's professional wrestling tag team championships
WWE women's championships
WWE tag team championships